Pingshan Station is a metro station of Line 1 of the Fuzhou Metro. It is located on the intersection of Guping Road, Qiantang Lane and Yeshan Road in Gulou District, Fuzhou, Fujian, China. It started operation on Jan 6, 2017.

Station layout

Exits

References 

Railway stations in China opened in 2017
Fuzhou Metro stations